Kevin Bazil (born 24 November 1989) is a Guyanese cricketer. He has played first-class cricket for Guyana. He was named in the Cayman Islands' squad for the 2017 ICC World Cricket League Division Five tournament in South Africa. He played in the Cayman Islands' opening fixture, against Qatar, on 3 September 2017.

See also
 List of Guyanese representative cricketers

References

External links
 

1989 births
Living people
Guyanese cricketers
Guyana cricketers
Caymanian cricketers
Place of birth missing (living people)